Fon Angwafo III of Mankon (1 May 1925 – 21 May 2022) was a Cameroonian traditional ruler.

Life
Fon Angwafo III was born in French Cameroon, on 1 May 1925.

He attended the Aggrey Memorial College Arochuku, in eastern Nigeria, from 1945 to 1950. He later studied at the University College Ibadan, Nigeria, from which he graduated in 1953 with a Diploma in Agriculture. He became the twentieth Fon of Mankon in 1959.

Fon Angwafo III was a member of the Parliament of Cameroon from 1962 to 1988. He also served as the first vice chair of the Cameroon People's Democratic Movement.

He disappeared on 21 May 2022, at the age of 97.

His son Fru Asaah Angwafo IV succeeded him on 7 June 2022.

Works
 Royalty and Politics. The Story of My Life (2009)

References

1925 births
2022 deaths
Cameroonian traditional rulers
University of Ibadan alumni
Cameroon People's Democratic Movement politicians
Members of the National Assembly (Cameroon)
20th-century Cameroonian politicians